Reykjavik International Games (RIG) is an annual multi-sport event taking place in late-January/early-February in Reykjavík, Iceland.

History
It is held in the Reykjavik districts, and there are sports facilities such as a main stadium, pool and skating rink in the district where each competition is held. It was first held in 2007 as an international competition for athletics and swimming, and has been held in January every year since then. As of 2016, 22 events was be held.

Editions
 2008 Reykjavik International Games
 2009 Reykjavik International Games
 2010 Reykjavik International Games
 2011 Reykjavik International Games
 2012 Reykjavik International Games
 2013 Reykjavik International Games
 2014 Reykjavik International Games
 2015 Reykjavik International Games
 2016 Reykjavik International Games
 2017 Reykjavik International Games
 2018 Reykjavik International Games
 2019 Reykjavik International Games
 2020 Reykjavik International Games
 2021 Reykjavik International Games
 2022 Reykjavik International Games -  January 29th and until February 6th 2022, in Reykjavík, Iceland. 15th Reykjavik International Games 2022. 3000 participants - 45 countries.

Sports
The following sports are part of the program:

References

External links
Home page

Sports competitions in Reykjavík
Multi-sport events in Iceland